Anoteropsis litoralis is a species of wolf spider that is endemic to New Zealand.



Etymology
The name "litoralis" refers to the seashore habitat of the species.

Taxonomy
Anoteropsis litoralis was described in 2002.

Description
Anoteropsis litoralis can be distinguished from other species of Anoteropsis by its yellow dorsal surface with black markings and several unique features in the male and female reproductive organs.

Habitat and distribution
Anoteropsis litoralis occupies sand dunes and beaches along the coast. They can be found in these habitats north of 44°S in New Zealand (Many habitats to the south are typically occupied by Anoteropsis forsteri, a similar species).

References

Lycosidae
Spiders of New Zealand
Spiders described in 2002
Endemic fauna of New Zealand
Endemic spiders of New Zealand